Lukinskaya is a rural locality (a village) in Muravyovskoye Rural Settlement of Velsky District, Arkhangelsk Oblast, Russia. The population was 1,062 as of 2014. There are 12 streets.

Geography 
Lukinskaya is located on the Vaga River, 3 km north of Velsk (the district's administrative centre) by road. Voronovskaya is the nearest rural locality.

References 

Rural localities in Velsky District